Darnell Martin (born October 16, 1991) is an American professional basketball player for Pioneros de Los Mochis of the Circuito de Baloncesto de la Costa del Pacífico (CIBACOPA).

References

External links
 RealGM profile

1991 births
Living people
American expatriate basketball people in Germany
American expatriate basketball people in Japan
American expatriate basketball people in Mexico
Basketball players from California
Kagoshima Rebnise players
Saitama Broncos players
Pioneros de Los Mochis players
American men's basketball players
Sportspeople from West Covina, California
Power forwards (basketball)
People from La Puente, California